Sami Aslam (born 12 December 1995) is a Pakistani cricketer who played for the Pakistan national cricket team between 2015 and 2017 before joining Major League Cricket. He was a left-handed batsman and an occasional right-arm off spin bowler.

He is currently the second-highest run-scorer in U-19 ODI history with 1695 runs. He was part of the Pakistan Under-19 cricket team that took part in the 2012 ICC Under-19 Cricket World Cup in Australia. He was the captain of the team at the 2014 ICC Under-19 Cricket World Cup in the United Arab Emirates, where he led Pakistan to the finals of the tournament. In 2014 he was selected for PCB summer camp. He played his last series for Pakistan in October  2017 vs Sri Lanka.

In March 2019, he was named in Punjab's squad for the 2019 Pakistan Cup. In September 2019, he was named in Southern Punjab's squad for the 2019–20 Quaid-e-Azam Trophy tournament.

In November 2020, Aslam ended his career in Pakistan, with an aim of possibly representing the United States. He would be eligible to play for USA on November 2023. In June 2021, Aslam was selected in the players' draft ahead of the Minor League Cricket tournament.

References

External links

1995 births
Living people
Pakistani cricketers
Pakistan Test cricketers
Pakistan One Day International cricketers
Federal Areas cricketers
National Bank of Pakistan cricketers
Lahore Eagles cricketers
Cricketers from Lahore
Southern Punjab (Pakistan) cricketers
People from Lahore